Sankal is a village in southwestern Djibouti. It is situated about 24 kilometres (15 miles) southwestern of Dikhil and 1 km north of the border with Ethiopia.

Overview
Nearby towns and villages include Dikhil (26 km), Bondara (15 km) and As Eyla (12 km). The village inhabitants belong to various mainly Afro-Asiatic-speaking ethnic groups, with the Issa Somali predominant.

Climate
Sankal has a hot arid climate (Köppen BWh), with two main seasons. There is a short monsoonal wet season from July to September and a length dry season covering the rest of the year.

References

Populated places in Djibouti